Beanland is a surname. Notable people with the surname include:

Denver Beanland (born 1945), Australian state politician
Douglas Beanland (1893–1963), British Indian Army officer
John Beanland (1866–1943), New Zealand politician
Rachel Beanland, American author of Florence Adler Swims Forever
Robin Beanland (born 1968), British video game music composer

See also
Bernard Paul Gascoigne Beanlands (1897-1918), Canadian World War I flying ace

English-language surnames